The 2015 Women's Asian Individual Squash Championships is the women's edition of the 2015 Asian Individual Squash Championships, which serves as the individual Asian championship for squash players. The event took place in Kuwait from 1 to 5 May 2015. Nicol David won her ninth Asian Individual Championships title, defeating Annie Au in the final.

Seeds

Draw and results

See also
2015 Men's Asian Individual Squash Championships
Asian Individual Squash Championships

References

External links
Asian Individual Squash Championships 2015 SquashSite website

2015 in squash
Squash in Asia
Squash tournaments in Kuwait
2015 in Kuwaiti sport
2015 in women's squash
International sports competitions hosted by Kuwait